Kiyoyuki (written:  or ) is a masculine Japanese given name. Notable people with the name include:

, Japanese aikidoka
, Japanese voice actor

Japanese masculine given names